Christoph Kittel (born around 1620  - died Dresden, 1680, of the pest) was a German organist, music publisher. He was son of Kaspar Kittel, baptized at Lauenstein in 1603, died on 9 Dec. 1939 in Dresden, who had become a member of the Dresden Court orchestra on 23 Sept. 1616. The Saxon Elector sent him to Venice from 1624 - to 1629 to study singing and playing the theorb.  When back in Dresden, he was promoted to court organist. With the publication of his "Arien und Cantaten" (texts by Opitz), Kaspar Kittel became the first German composer to use the Italian terms 'aria and cantata', by which he meant strophic variations. His son Christoph (born 1620 or a little later, died of the pest in 1680) was appointed to the Dresden Hofkapelle as player of the lute. Like his father Kaspar Kittel Christoph was a pupil of Heinrich Schütz ; Christoph published the "Zwölff geistlichen Konzerte" of Schütz in 1657" (SWV 420-31).
Christoph only had two children:
Anna Maria Kittel (Dresden 7.8.1648 - 6.9.1680 Colditz), buried on 7. Sept., married in 1674 Magister Martin Haugk, rector of the Colditz school.
Her brother Johann Kittel, Christoph's only son (13.10.1652 - 17.7.1682 Dresden, GND 131664816) became second organist at the  Dresden Court chapel; he seems not to have married and children have not been found so far.

References
 
 Reallexikon der deutschen Literaturwissenschaft on Christoph's father Kaspar Kittel (baptized Lauenstein in 1603, died 9.10.1639 Dresden) writes: "als musikalischer Gattungsbegriff ist die Arie...um 1600 in Italien greifbar...  Im deutschen Sprachgebrauch findet sich die Kategorie erstmals bei Kaspar Kittel. der 1638 nach italienischem Vorbild 'Arien und Cantaten' auf Dichtungen von Martin Opitz veröffentlichte". Kaspar was possibly born in Böhmisch-Kamnitz, where his father Melchior was the protestant pastor for eight years from 1596-1603; member of the Dresden Court Orchestra since 23.9.1616; theorbist, 1624-1629 at the expense of the Saxon Elector in Venice, where he studied song and the theorbe; Court Organist in Dresden.

Genealogical Archive Werner Kittel deeded to the Institut für Personengeschichte at Bensheim, Germany

Year of birth unknown
1680 deaths
German organists
German male organists
German male musicians
Pupils of Heinrich Schütz
Year of birth uncertain